Jeffrey Harold Cason (born April 10, 1953) is an American businessman and politician who served as a member of the Texas House of Representatives from the 92nd district. Elected in November 2020, he assumed office on January 12, 2021 and departed in 2023.

Career 
Before retiring, Cason was a sales manager for Höganäs AB and H.C. Starck GmbH. Cason was elected to the Texas House of Representatives in November 2020 and assumed office on January 4, 2021. In the House, Cason served on the County Affairs and Criminal Jurisprudence committees.

Personal life 
Cason lives in Bedford, Texas with his wife, Wendy. Both had children from prior marriages.

References

External links
 Campaign website
 State legislative page

1953 births
Living people
Republican Party members of the Texas House of Representatives
People from Bedford, Texas